The 11th European Women's Artistic Gymnastics Championships were held in Prague.

Romanian Withdrawal 

The Romanian team walked out the competition during the beam finals. According to the Romanian federation, this decision was taken "as a result of some technical deficiencies and of some methods appeared in the referees' actions which altered the results".

Ironically, the Romanian withdrawal happened right after Nadia Comăneci's performance, for which she received a perfect 10. If she had not left the building, she would have won the gold medal in the beam finals.

Medalists

Results

Vault

Uneven Bars

Balance Beam

Floor exercise

References 

 https://www.nytimes.com/1977/05/15/archives/rumanian-gymnasts-quit-womens-meet-in-dispute.html

1977
European Artistic Gymnastics Championships
1977 in European sport
1977 in Czechoslovak sport
European Artistic Gymnastics Championships
Europe